The Registrar General's Department is the Government of Ghana agency responsible for the registration of companies and business in Ghana.

History
The department was set up under the Ordinance in 1950.  Ghana was still a colony of the British empire when the department was created. In 1961, it became a department of the Ministry of Justice in 1961.

See also
 List of company registers

References

Ministries and Agencies of State of Ghana
Registrars of companies